Gronów may refer to the following places in Poland:
Gronów, Lower Silesian Voivodeship (south-west Poland)
Gronów, Łódź Voivodeship (central Poland)
Gronów, Krosno Odrzańskie County in Lubusz Voivodeship (west Poland)
Gronów, Słubice County in Lubusz Voivodeship (west Poland)
Gronów, Świebodzin County in Lubusz Voivodeship (west Poland)

Gronow may also refer to the following people:
Ben Gronow (1887-1967), Wales dual-code international rugby player
Berengar Elsner von Gronow (born 1978), German politician
Laurens Theodor Gronow (1730-1777), Dutch naturalist
Rees Howell Gronow (1794–1865), dandy and writer of reminiscences